Mount Albert School is a primary school in the suburb of Mount Albert, Auckland, New Zealand that caters for boys and girls from Year 1 to Year 6.
it currently has a roll of 495 and its current principal is Marian Caulfield.

School history 
The original school was built in 1870 on one acre of farmland donated by Mr McElwain to the Auckland Education Board. The first school building was built by local residents using their own money. The school went through several expansions on the original site at 13 School Road, Kingsland, New Zealand, before the school was moved to its current site on Sainsbury Road in 1940. The original school building still stands but is in a state of disrepair. A new school building was opened in June 2015 by Education Minister Hekia Parata.

Mt Albert School principals

Notable students  

 Robert Muldoon - New Zealand Prime Minister, 1975-1984

References 

Primary schools in Auckland